Rajendar is a surname. Notable people with the surname include:

Silambarasan Rajendar (born 1983), Indian actor
T. Rajendar (born 1955), Indian actor

See also
Rajendra (name)

Indian surnames